$10 Raise is a 1935 American comedy film directed by George Marshall, written by Henry Johnson and Lou Breslow, and starring Edward Everett Horton, Karen Morley, Alan Dinehart, Glen Boles, Berton Churchill and Rosina Lawrence. It was released on May 4, 1935, by Fox Film Corporation.

Plot
Hubert T. Wilkins is a bookkeeper who is encouraged by his romantic interest, Emily Converse, to ask his boss, Mr. Bates, for a $10 dollar pay rise. He is then fired and has no money for his and Emily's wedding. He seeks to invest in property to regain his fortune.

Cast    
Edward Everett Horton as Hubert T. Wilkins
Karen Morley as Emily Converse
Alan Dinehart as Fuller
Glen Boles as Don Bates
Berton Churchill as Mr. Bates
Rosina Lawrence as Dorothy Converse
Ray Walker as Perry
Frank Melton as Clark
William "Billy" Benedict as Jimmy

References

External links
 

1935 films
American comedy films
1935 comedy films
Fox Film films
Films directed by George Marshall
American black-and-white films
1930s English-language films
1930s American films